The National Police Chiefs' Council (NPCC) is a national coordination body for law enforcement in the United Kingdom and the representative body for British police chief officers. Established on 1 April 2015, it replaced the former Association of Chief Police Officers (ACPO), following the Parker Review of the operations of ACPO.

History 

The NPCC was established on 1 April 2015 as the replacement organisation of the Association of Chief Police Officers.

In 2010, the Cameron Government announced a series of police reforms including local accountability through police and crime commissioners (PCC), and the creation of the National Crime Agency and the College of Policing. In 2013, the PCCs commissioned General Sir Nick Parker to review the services that ACPO provided and make recommendations about the requirements of a national policing body following the fundamental changes in policing. In 2014, a group of chief officers and PCCs began working together to implement Parker's recommendations and develop a national body. Chief officers voted in support of the group's proposals in July 2014. Chief Constable Sara Thornton was appointed to chair the NPCC on 2 December 2014. ACPO was closed down on 31 March 2015.

In October 2018, the NPCC threatened to take legal action in the High Court against government's plans to cut hundreds of millions of pounds from police funding.  The Treasury planned to increase the money each force pays to the police pension scheme. This would involve forces paying a £420million bill, as well as the 19% cut to police funding since 2010.  Police chiefs maintain reductions have make it hard for forces to protect the public. Leaders of three of the biggest forces fear officer levels will drop to those of the 1970s. The NPCC fears if the £420million bill is dealt with only by cutting police numbers, this will mean 10,000 fewer officers.

Structure and membership 
The NPCC is founded by a legal agreement between chief constables, PCCs, and non-Home Office police force equivalents under Section 22A of the Police Act 1996. It is hosted by the Metropolitan Police Service (MPS) but acts independently.

The NPCC brings together and is funded by police forces in England, Wales and Northern Ireland as well as the armed services and some British overseas territories. Since 2019/20, following a letter of agreement with NPCC, the Police Service of Scotland contributes to the funding of the NPCC and has the same involvement in the governance and arrangements of the NPCC as any other member. It draws on the efforts and expertise of chief officers: those ranked assistant chief constable and above, or commander and above in MPS and City of London Police, and senior police staff equivalents. It coordinates police forces' collective operational responses to national threats such as terrorism, organised crime and national emergencies.

The current NPCC chair is Martin Hewitt, previously vice-chair (2015-2019). Michelle Skeer and Dave Thompson (chief constables of Cumbria Constabulary and West Midlands Police respectively) support him as vice-chairs in addition to serving as chief officers within their forces.

Chief Constables' Council 
The Chief Constables' Council is the senior operational decision-making body for the National Police Chiefs' Council. Every police force is represented in the work of the NPCC through the Chief Constables' Council.

The Chief Constables’ Council is the primary decision-making forum for the NPCC. Chief constables (and equivalents) meet quarterly to discuss operational policing issues and agree action. Working with the College of Policing, the council takes decisions on national standards and common approaches with the aim of protecting the public from the most serious and strategic threats.

Coordination committees
In addition to their day jobs, chief officers support the NPCC's work by providing national operational perspectives on particular crime and policing issues. There are eleven broad coordination committees, each led by a chief officer. Within each area, chief officers may also lead on specific issues - for example, under the Crime Operations Coordination Committee there are individual leads for domestic abuse, rape, drugs and cyber-crime. The coordination committees cover:

 Crime operations
 Criminal justice
 Equality, diversity and human rights
 Finance
 Information management
 International coordination
 Local policing 
 Operations
 Performance management
 Workforce
 Counter terrorism (chaired by Metropolitan Police Service assistant commissioner and responsible for the Counter Terrorism Policing)

Coordination committees work closely with the College of Policing to assist in the development of professional practice for police officers in different areas of policing. Representatives from the Government and other stakeholders in the criminal justice system and third sector are involved in the committees’ work to include a range of perspectives.

Projects 
The NPCC operates and/or collaborates with the following police projects:

 ACRO Criminal Records Office (ACRO)
 National Vehicle Crime Intelligence Service (NaVCIS)
 International Crime Coordination Centre (ICCC)
 National Ballistics Intelligence Service (NABIS)
 National Domestic Extremism and Disorder Intelligence Unit (NDEDIU)
 National Police Coordination Centre (NPoCC)
 National Police Freedom of Information and Data Protection Unit (NPFDU)
 National Wildlife Crime Unit (NWCU)
 Secured by Design
 Counter Terrorism Policing

See also 
 Operation Hydrant

References

External links 
 

Law enforcement in the United Kingdom
2015 establishments in the United Kingdom